The African Democratic Congress (ADC) is a political party in Nigeria. As of 2022, Ralph Nwosu is the National Chairman.There are 2 ADC members currently in the Nigerian National Assembly. They are all members of the House of Representatives and represent constituencies in Bauchi State. There are no ADC members currently in the Nigerian Senate.

History 

The party was originally named "Alliance for Democratic Change" when it was formed in 2005, but renamed the African Democratic Congress by the time the party was registered with the Nigerian Independent National Electoral Commission (INEC). The goal of this name change was for the party to be able "to effectively encompass and reflect the aspirations of our people." The ADC headquarters is located in Abuja, Nigeria.  

On 10 May 2018, the party was adopted by former Nigerian President, Olusegun Obasanjo's political movement called the "Coalition for Nigeria Movement" (CNM).  Obasanjo now serves as the chairman for the party. Per his speech titled "My Treatise For Future Of Democracy And Development In Nigeria", the goal of the CNM adopting the ADC was "to work with others for bringing about desirable change in the Nigeria polity and governance".

Constitution 
The African Democratic Congress outlines the details of the party and its workings.  The constitution contains a preamble, 27 articles, and 3 schedules.  According to the constitution, the goal of the ADC is to be a "grass root" party, composed primarily of  working-class and disadvantaged Nigerians. The constitution also outlines that membership of the ADC party is open to "every citizen of Nigeria irrespective religion, ethnic group, place of birth, sex, social or economic status", once they are over 18 years old, not an active public officer, and do not belong to any other political party in Nigeria (membership is extended to those who renounce other party affiliations). Monthly dues for membership in the ADC is 200.00 NGN.

Elections

Presidential 
In the 2007 Nigerian Presidential Election, the ADC put forth candidate Patrick Utomi.  He obtained 50,849 votes, and placed 4th in the election.

In the 2011 Nigerian Presidential Election, the ADC put forth candidate Rev. Peter Uchenna Nwangwu.  He obtained 51,682 votes and placed 8th out of the 20 candidates in the election.

In the 2015 Nigerian Presidential Election, the ADC put forth Dr. Mani Ibrahim Ahmad as their candidate.  He obtained 29,666 votes which was 0.10% of the votes cast.  He placed 7th out of 14 candidates.

In the 2019 Nigerian Presidential Election, the ADC put forth candidate Obadiah Mailafia. He obtained 97,874 votes and placed 4th out of 73 candidates in the election.

For the selection of their candidates for the 2023 Nigerian Presidential Election, the ADC used the Indirect Primary method in which only accredited delegates participated in the nomination of candidates that would run on the platform of the party at the 2023 Nigerian general election. On 09 June 2022,  the African Democratic Congress selected Dumebi Kachikwu as the candidate for the 2023 Nigerian general election Nigerian general elections.

Gubernatorial 
These are the results obtained by ADC candidates in general Gubernatorial Elections in Nigeria:

Senatorial 
These are the results obtained by  ADC candidates in general Senatorial Elections in Nigeria:

House of Representatives 
As of 2015, there were 5 ADC party members in the House of Representatives and represent constituencies in Oyo State. 
Hon. Abiodun Olasupo represents the Iseyin/Itesiwaju/Kajola/Iwajowa constituency. 
Hon. Adeyemi Sunday Adepoju represents the Ibarapa East/Ido constituency. 
Hon. Olusunbo Samson represents the Oluyole Local Govt. constituency  
Hon. Lam Adedapo represents the Ibadan North-East/ Ibadan South-East constituency. 
Hon. Akintola Taiwo represents the Ona-Ara/Egbeda constituency.

References

2005 establishments in Nigeria
Political parties established in 2005
Political parties in Nigeria